{{DISPLAYTITLE:C11H15N}}
The molecular formula C11H15N (molar mass: 161.24 g/mol) may refer to:

 Alfetamine, or alpha-allyl-phenethylamine
 Cypenamine, or 2-phenylcyclopentylamine
 4-Phenylpiperidine

Molecular formulas